The Asmat–Muli Strait languages are a branch of the Trans–New Guinea languages spoken along the southern coast of Indonesian New Guinea, established by Timothy Usher and Edgar Suter.

Protoforms of basic vocabulary include *moi 'water', *iafVnV 'ear', *uase 'name', *awoɣ 'breast'.

Subdivision
Asmat–Muli Strait consists of two primary subgroups:
Asmat–Kamrau
Muli Strait (or Mombum, Komolom)

Proto-language

Phonology
Proto-Asmat–Muli Strait is reconstructed with 12 consonants and 5 vowels:

{| 
| *m  || *n  ||  || 
|-
| *p  || *t  ||  || *k
|-
| *(m)b  || *(n)d  ||  || *(ŋ)g
|-
|   || *s  ||  || 
|-
| *w  || *ɾ  || *j  || 
|}

Vowels are *a *e *i *o *u.

Basic vocabulary
Some lexical reconstructions by Usher (2020) are:

{| class="wikitable sortable"
! gloss !! Proto-Asmat-Muli !! Proto-Asmat-Kamrau !! Proto-Muli Strait
|-
! head/hair
| *gVɸV || *uɸu || *ɣo̝p, *ɣo̝w
|-
! ear
| *iaɸVnV || *iaɸ[a/o]ne || *ie̝pær
|-
! nose/tip
| *mVnVgV || *m[e/a]n[e] || *mæne̝ɣ
|-
! tooth/sharp
| *sisV || *sisV || *-sir
|-
! blood
| *[i/e]sV || *ese || *ir
|-
! breast
| *awVgV || *awo || *abuɣ
|-
! louse
| *amV || *amo || *am
|-
! dog
| *iuwuɾi || *juwuɾi || *i[u]bui
|-
! pig
| *[o/u]ɸV || *oɸo || *up
|-
! egg
| *[o]k[a] || *oka || 
|-
! sun
| *jau[a] || *jawu || *zaua
|-
! water
| *mVi || *moi || *mo̝i
|-
! name
| *uase || *uwase || *ur
|-
! eat
| *nV || *nV || *no̝ku
|}

References

External links 
 Timothy Usher & Edgar Suter, New Guinea World, Proto–Asmat – Muli Strait
Asmat-Kamrau Bay. New Guinea World.
Asmat-Kamoro. New Guinea World.
Asmat. New Guinea World.
Kamrau Bay. New Guinea World.
Muli Strait. New Guinea World.

 
Languages of Indonesia
Languages of western New Guinea
Trans–New Guinea languages